Jacob Sitler (born June 18, 1989) is an American professional racing cyclist, who last rode for UCI Continental team . He rode in the men's team time trial at the 2015 UCI Road World Championships. He raced the 2022 Mountain bike Marathon World Championships in Haderslev, Denmark.

Major results
2018
 1st Stage 1 Sea Otter Classic

References

External links

1989 births
Living people
American male cyclists
People from York, Pennsylvania
Cyclists from Pennsylvania